This article lists the winners and nominees for the Black Reel Award for Outstanding Supporting Actor in a Television Movie or Limited Series. The category was retired during the 2008 ceremony, but later returned in 2013. In May 2017 the category was moved from the film awards as part of the Black Reel Awards for Television honors thus resulting in two separate winners in 2017.

Winners and nominees
Winners are listed first and highlighted in bold.

2000s

2010s

2020s

Superlatives

Programs with multiple awards

Performers with multiple awards

2 wins
 Jeffrey Wright

Programs with multiple nominations

4 nominations
 When They See Us

3 nominations
 Being Mary Jane
 Boycott
 Watchmen

2 nominations
 Bessie
 Everyday People
 Freedom Song
 Introducing Dorothy Dandridge
 Lackawanna Blues
 The New Edition Story
 Seven Seconds

Performers with multiple nominations

 3 Nominations
 Reg E. Cathey
 Mekhi Phifer
 Michael K. Williams
 Bokeem Woodbine

 2 Nominations
 Charles S. Dutton
 Danny Glover
 Louis Gossett Jr.
 Wood Harris
 Russell Hornsby
 Terrence Howard
 Harry Lennix
 Vicellous Reon Shannon
 Courtney B. Vance
 Jeffrey Wright

Total awards by network
 HBO - 8
 BET - 2
 FX - 2 
 Netflix - 2
 Amazon Prime Video - 1
 Disney Channel - 1
 Lifetime - 1
 Showtime - 1

References

Black Reel Awards
Television awards for Best Supporting Actor